José Adolfo Ríos García (born 11 December 1966) is a Mexican former professional footballer who played as a goalkeeper. He won the 1999 U.S. Cup with Mexico.

Club career 
Ríos García made his debut for UNAM in 1985 and remained there until 1990, when he went to play for Veracruz. He was a starter for Veracruz, playing 7 years, making over 230 appearances for the team. In 1997, he went on to play for Necaxa. In the winter of 1998, he became won the Mexican Primera División for the first time, defeating Chivas de Guadalajara on an aggregate score of 0–2. He continued to play with the club for one more season, making 72 appearances with the club in total. In the summer of 1999, he transferred to Club America, and became an instant starter. In the summer of 2002, he was the starting goalkeeper for America in their victory against Necaxa in the Championship Final, which allowed him to win the second Mexican Primera División title of his career, and Club America's ninth overall. In the Clausura 2004, Ríos suffered an injury, which ruled him out for several weeks. He was replaced in goal by Guillermo Ochoa. Later, both Ríos and Ochoa shared the starting spot, and after the quarter final, in which America was eliminated, Ríos announces his retirement from professional football at 37 years of age, following a career spanning about two decades.

International career 
At international level, Ríos played for Mexico as starter at two Copa América tournaments, in 1997 and 1999. At both editions of the competition, he helped Mexico reach the semi-finals and obtain third place medals. He was starter at the 1999 Nike US Cup, which Mexico won.

Personal life 
In 2012, Ríos was presented as the new president of Club Querétaro. He resigned at the end of 2014, after 2 years in service. Rios was known as "El Arquero De Cristo".

Honours 
Necaxa
Mexican Primera División: Invierno 1998

América
Mexican Primera División: Verano 2002

References 

 
 

1966 births
Living people
Mexico international footballers
1997 Copa América players
1999 Copa América players
Club América footballers
Club Universidad Nacional footballers
C.D. Veracruz footballers
Liga MX players
People from Uruapan
Footballers from Michoacán
Mexican footballers
Association football goalkeepers